Gary James Knoke (4 February 1942 – 9 July 1984) was Australian Olympic Games and Commonwealth Games competing track and field athlete who was ranked third in the world in 400 metres hurdles during 1966.

National representative

Knoke represented Australia at the 1964 Summer Olympics (Tokyo), 1968 Summer Olympics (Mexico City) and 1972 Summer Olympics (Munich). In Tokyo, on 16 October 1964, he was placed fourth in the 400 metre hurdles final behind Rex Cawley of the United States of America, John Cooper of Great Britain and Salvatore Morale of Italy. He attended the 1962 British Empire and Commonwealth Games, 1966 British Empire and Commonwealth Games, 1970 British Commonwealth Games, 1974 British Commonwealth Games and the Pacific Conference Games twice.

World ranking
During his competitive career in the 400 Metre Hurdles, Knoke was ranked as follows:
 1964 - Seventh
 1965 - Eighth
 1966 - Third
 1967 - Tenth
 1968 - Ninth
 1969 - Tenth

Teaching and coaching career
He began his teaching career at Kingsgrove North High School in 1963. From 1974 until 1980, Knoke was a physical education teacher and athletics coach at Newington College. During that time Newington won the Athletic Association of the Great Public Schools of New South Wales (GPS) junior athletics four times and the senior athletics once. In 1981 he joined the staff of the Australian Institute of Sport as a hurdles coach. Knoke died in 1984 of cancer.

Honours
Knoke Avenue in Gordon, Australian Capital Territory, is named in his honour. The Gary Knoke Memorial Scholarship is an award for track and field athletics presented annually by the Australian Institute of Sport; recipients of this scholarship have included Simon Hollingsworth, Rohan Robinson and Kyle Vander Kuyp.

References

1942 births
1984 deaths
Australian male hurdlers
Australian male sprinters
Olympic athletes of Australia
Athletes (track and field) at the 1962 British Empire and Commonwealth Games
Athletes (track and field) at the 1964 Summer Olympics
Athletes (track and field) at the 1966 British Empire and Commonwealth Games
Athletes (track and field) at the 1968 Summer Olympics
Athletes (track and field) at the 1970 British Commonwealth Games
Athletes (track and field) at the 1972 Summer Olympics
Athletes (track and field) at the 1974 British Commonwealth Games
Staff of Newington College
Australian Institute of Sport coaches
Commonwealth Games competitors for Australia
20th-century Australian people